Chengalpattu taluk is a taluk of Chengalpattu district of the Indian state of Tamil Nadu. The headquarters of the taluk is the town of Chengalpattu.

Demographics
According to the 2011 census, the taluk of Chengalpattu had a population of 571,254 with 288,411 males and 282,843 females. There were 981 women for every 1,000 men. The taluk had a literacy rate of 77.56%. Child population in the age group below 6 was 29,492 Males and 28,476 Females.

History
This taluk was earlier, a part of the Kanchipuram district until the district was bifurcated and a new district Chengalpattu district was created.

Administration
The taluk is administered by the Tahsildar office located in Chengalpattu.

References 

Taluks of Chengalpattu district